The Pakistan Ju-Jitsu Federation (PJJF) is the national official governing body to promote and control Ju Jitsu Sports activities in Pakistan and is currently headed by Mr. Khalil Ahmed Khan a martial artist having black belt 6 Dan and more than 36 years of experience in coaching. The federation was established in the year 1996. Ju-Jitsu is the only Sports in Pakistan which brought many Laurels for the country by winning Gold, Silver and bronze medals from the official games i.e. Asian Beach Games, Asian Martial Arts Games, Asian Martial arts and Indoor Games.

Affiliations
The federation is affiliated with:

 Ju Jitsu Asian Union
 Ju-Jitsu International Federation (JJIF)
 Pakistan Olympic Association
 Asian Belt Wrestling Federation

Affiliated bodies
The federation has following affiliated bodies
 Balochistan Ju Jitsu Association
 Khyber Phakhtunkhwa Ju Jitsu Association
 Sindh Ju Jitsu Association
 Punjab Ju Jitsu Association
 Pakistan Police
 Pakistan WAPDA 
 Islamabad Ju Jitsu Association
 Pakistan Navy
 Pakistan Army
 Pakistan Air Force
 Higher Education Commission
 Gilgit Baltistan Ju Jitsu Association
 DHA Lahore

References

External links
 Official Website

Sports governing bodies in Pakistan
Jujutsu
1996 establishments in Pakistan
Sports organizations established in 1996